The Conquest of Canaan is a 1921 American silent drama film produced by Famous Players-Lasky and distributed by Paramount Pictures. It starred Thomas Meighan and Doris Kenyon and was directed by Roy William Neill. It was filmed in Asheville, North Carolina.  A previous version of the story was filmed in 1916 under the same title.

Plot

Cast

Preservation status
This film was considered lost for over seventy years until 2010, when a digital copy was returned to the United States as a gift from Russia and its film archive Gosfilmofond.

References

External links

1921 films
American silent feature films
Films based on American novels
Films directed by Roy William Neill
Famous Players-Lasky films
Films based on works by Booth Tarkington
1921 drama films
Silent American drama films
American black-and-white films
1920s rediscovered films
Rediscovered American films
1920s American films